It's That Man Again is a 1943 British comedy film directed by Walter Forde and starring Tommy Handley, Greta Gynt and Jack Train. It was based on Handley's radio show It's That Man Again. In the film, the mayor of a small town lends his assistance to some drama students.

Plot
The disreputable mayor (Tommy Handley) of small town Foaming-at-the-Mouth gambles the civic accounts and wins a bombed out local theatre. He steals the rights to a new play which he stages in an attempt to save the financial situation. However, local drama students he has cheated turn up and try to ruin the show.

Cast
 Tommy Handley ...  Mayor Handley
 Greta Gynt ...  Stella Ferris
 Jack Train ...  Lefty/Funf
 Sydney Keith ...  Sam Scram
 Horace Percival ...  Alley-Oop/Cecil
 Claude Bailey ...  C.B. Cato
 Franklyn Bennett ...  Hilary Craven
 Vera Frances ...  Daisy
 Dino Galvani ...  Signor Soso
 Jean Kent ...  Kitty
 Leonard Sharp ...  Claude
 Dorothy Summers ...  Mrs. Mopp
 Clarence Wright ...  Clarence
 Richard George ... Uncle Percy

Critical reception
TV Guide wrote: "This wartime comedy has some genuinely funny moments but never rises to the fevered pitch that would really give it the needed craziness. The story is taken from a delightfully loopy British radio show, but the translation to screen just doesn't work". Radio Times has called it "disappointing," commenting on Tommy Handley, "the Liverpool-born comic's fast-talking style felt forced when shackled to the demands of a storyline, and his weaknesses as a physical comedian restricted the type of business he was able to carry off. Thus, while casting him as the devious mayor of Foaming-at-the-Mouth seemed sound enough, the events that follow his acquisition of a bombed-out London theatre feel like so much padding." The Spinning Image was more positive, "if you approached it as a British predecessor to the Hollywood cult comedy Hellzapoppin' then you would have some idea of what to expect, with Handley demonstrating his dazzling ability with wordplay, reeling off the puns at a dizzying rate...Anarchic was the word to apply here, with the show they manage to get off the ground for the finale surprisingly hilarious in its throwing in everything but the kitchen sink style of laughs; before that it was patchily amusing, but engaging enough. As a record of a comedy phenomenon – twenty-two million listeners, as the titles proclaim – this was invaluable."

References

External links

1943 films
1943 comedy films
Films directed by Walter Forde
British comedy films
British black-and-white films
1940s English-language films
1940s British films